Whitney "Strix" Beltrán is a narrative designer and Project Narrative Director at Hidden Path Entertainment. Her writing and design career includes the indie game Bluebeard's Bride. She also founded the advocacy initiative Gaming as Other to promote inclusivity in the gaming community.

Early life and education
Beltrán has said she started playing NES at a young age, playing RPG before she was a teenager, and was running game organizations in her early 20s. In graduate school, she studied mythology. As a PhD student, she conducted research for the game lab at the Carnegie Mellon Human-Computer Interaction Institute, and was advised by Jessica Hammer.

Career 
Beltrán has written for a variety of video games, including State of Decay 2 and Beyond Blue. She was the narrative designer for the 2020 augmented reality (AR) game, HoloVista, which she described as "a strange ode to post-modernism and Western capitalism, bathed in vaporwave-y aesthetics." In March 2021, it was announced she would be the narrative director for an upcoming open-world D&D video game by Hidden Path Entertainment. She was also a writer on the D&D campaign guide book Van Richten's Guide to Ravenloft (2021).

Bluebeard's Bride 
Beltrán wrote and designed the game with Marissa Kelly and Sarah Richardson, based on the Bluebeard fairy tale. After $130,000 was raised for development, and extensive research conducted by Beltrán and her coauthors  into classic characters in western horror, Magpie Games released Bluebeard's Bride in October 2017 as a tabletop roleplaying game. In a review for Dread Central, Rachel Beck writes, "The story itself has the elegant simplicity of a fairytale," and it "is an explicitly feminine horror piece, and at its heart it's a game about systemic social and physical violence towards women." Sharang Biswas at Dicebreaker writes, "The point is for the players to fail, to experience what failure means. Through this, the game delivers its central ideas of feminist and feminine horror, using powerlessness as a game mechanic and employing supernatural hyperbole of real-world misogyny to highlight anti-feminist thought." Matt Baume, writing for Vice, writes that Beltrán and her coauthors "unpacked centuries of narrative tradition, and eventually distilled their feminine archetypes into Animus, which embodies strength; Virgin, representing obedience; Witch, suggesting sinfulness; Fatale, for sensuality; and a Mother who soothes." Magpie Games released Bluebeard's Bride: Book of Rooms in 2018, Bluebeard's Bride: Book of Lore and Bluebeard's Bride: Book of Mirrors in 2019, and Bluebeard's Bride: Booklet of Keepsakes in 2020.

Gaming as Other

Gaming as Other is an initiative founded by Beltrán to promote inclusivity in the gaming community. Outreach has included panel discussions, short videos, and written commentary that advocates for inclusion in the gaming industry. Beltrán is also a member of The Diversity, Equity and Inclusion Committee (DEI) of the Science Fiction and Fantasy Writers of America.

Works

Honors and awards
 2018 Game of the Year, Best Art, Indie Game Developer Network (Bluebeard's Bride)
 2018 IndieCade Grand Jury Award (Bluebeard's Bride)
 2019 ENnie Awards nominee, Best RPG Related Product (Bluebeard's Bride: Book of Lore)
 2020 Presenter, 55th Annual Nebula Awards
 2021 The Game Awards Future Class

See also 
 List of women in the video game industry

References

External links 
 StrixWerks (Official Website)
 Video: Insights from the GDC 2019 Narrative Innovation Showcase (Gamasutra, 2019)

Living people
Place of birth missing (living people)
Year of birth missing (living people)
Hispanic and Latino American women
Women video game designers
Video game designers